Scripps may refer to:

People
 Edward W. Scripps (1854–1926), American publisher and media financier
 Ellen Browning Scripps (1836–1932), American philanthropist, half-sister of Edward W. Scripps
 James E. Scripps (1835–1906), American newspaper publisher, brother of Ellen Browning Scripps
 Samuel H. Scripps (1927–2007), American philanthropist in theater and dance, grandson of Edward W. Scripps
 Anne Scripps (1946–1993), heiress to the Scripps newspaper publishing and great-great granddaughter of James E. Scripps
 Charles Scripps (1920–2007), chairman of the board of the E. W. Scripps Company and grandson of Edward W. Scripps
 Dan Scripps, American politician
 John Locke Scripps (1818–1866), attorney, journalist, and author. First cousin once removed of E.W. Scripps
 John Martin Scripps (1959–1996), British serial killer
 Natalee Scripps (born 1978), New Zealand cricketer
 William Edmund Scripps (1882–1952), American founder of WWJ radio, son of James E. Scripps

Organizations and enterprises
 E. W. Scripps Company, American media conglomerate founded by Edward W. Scripps
 Scripps Center, office building owned by E. W. Scripps Company in Cincinnati, Ohio, U.S.
 Scripps Howard Foundation, the corporate foundation of the E. W. Scripps Company
 Scripps National Spelling Bee, annual American competition sponsored by E. W. Scripps Company
 Scripps Networks Interactive, American cable TV media company spun-off from E. W. Scripps Company
 Scripps Health, a not-for-profit, community-based health care delivery network in San Diego, California, U.S.
 Scripps Institution of Oceanography, an ocean and earth science institution in San Diego, California, U.S.
 Scripps League Newspapers, a newspaper publishing company in the United States founded by Josephine Scripps in 1921
 Scripps Research, American medical research facility
Scripps-Booth, early 20th century American automobile company

Places 
 Scripps Canyon, underwater gorge in the Pacific Ocean off the coast of southern California
 Scripps Coastal Reserve, reserve located west of UC San Diego in La Jolla Farms
 Scripps Cottage, part of the campus of San Diego State University in San Diego, California, U.S.
 Scripps Formation, a geologic formation in coastal San Diego County, California
 Scripps Heights, heights on the east coast of Palmer Land, Antarctica
 Scripps Mansion, personal estate of William Edmund Scripps in Lake Orion, Michigan, U.S.
 Scripps Ranch, San Diego, community in San Diego, California, U.S.

Schools
 Scripps College, women's college in Claremont, California, U.S.
 Scripps College of Communication, a division of Ohio University, U.S.
 E. W. Scripps School of Journalism, part of the college

See also